The Turkmenistan Memorial Capsule is a memorial satellite which was launched in 2005 to a sun-synchronous orbit by a Ukrainian Dnepr rocket

The capsule is bolted to the Dnepr 3rd stage and it contains a flag of Turkmenistan and the book of Ruhnama.

References 

Satellites of Turkmenistan
2005 in Turkmenistan
Spacecraft launched by Dnepr rockets
Spacecraft launched in 2005